Breeze-Eastern Corporation is an American manufacturing company which was set up in 1926 and is now based in Whippany, New Jersey. Breeze-Eastern is the world's only dedicated helicopter hoist and winch provider and the world's largest cargo hook systems manufacturer. The company focuses on engineered equipment for specialty aerospace/defense applications. It also manufactures weapons handling systems and tie-down equipment for military and civilian agencies.

History 
Since the company's establishment, it has manufactured equipment for many types of helicopters around the world, such as the compact Agusta A1B, Sikorsky S-58, Sikorsky CH-53 Super Stallion, Sikorsky H-60 Hawk platforms, and Boeing tandem rotor CH-47 Chinook. The company has received supplemental type certificates (STC) from the FAA.

In 2006, TransTechnology Corporation changed its name to Breeze-Eastern Corporation (AMEX:BZC), since its  products are known as Breeze-Eastern products.

Products and services
The company's products sales represented approximately 75% of its total revenues during the fiscal year ended March 31, 2013 (fiscal 2013). It provides helicopter hoist and cargo hook systems (such as Sikorsky H-60, Blackhawk and Naval Hawk, CH53-K Super Stallion, Bell-Boeing V-22 Osprey, Boeing CH-47 Chinook); hydraulic and electric aircraft cargo winch systems; cargo and aircraft tie-downs; weapons handling systems for the European Multiple-Launch Rocket Systems (MLRS) and the United States High Mobility Artillery Rocket System (HIMARS).
The company's Services include overhaul and maintenance, representing 25% of its total revenues in fiscal 2013.

References

External links 
 

Manufacturing companies established in 1926
Companies based in Morris County, New Jersey
Hanover Township, New Jersey
Companies listed on NYSE American
1926 establishments in New Jersey